Claudio Marrero Guzman (born 6 March 1989) is a Dominican professional boxer who held the WBA interim, and IBO featherweight titles in 2017.

Amateur career

Marrero was the silver medalist at the 2007 Pan American Games in the bantamweight division. He came within one win of qualifying for the 2008 Summer Olympics, losing to Yankiel León of Cuba 12:1. Marrero also competed at the 2007 AIBA World Boxing Championships and 2009 AIBA World Boxing Championships.

Professional career

On 23 August 2013, Marrero lost to Jesús Cuellar for the interim WBA featherweight title on ESPN Friday Night Fights. On 29 April 2017, he won the WBA interim, and IBO featherweight titles by knocking out Carlos Zambrano in the first round. He would lose the WBA belt in his next fight by KO against Jesus Rojas.

Professional boxing record

See also
List of world featherweight boxing champions

References

External links

 

1989 births
Living people
Featherweight boxers
World featherweight boxing champions
World Boxing Association champions
International Boxing Organization champions
Sportspeople from Santo Domingo
Dominican Republic male boxers
Pan American Games medalists in boxing
Pan American Games silver medalists for the Dominican Republic
Boxers at the 2007 Pan American Games
Medalists at the 2007 Pan American Games